Long Nardy, also just Nardy, is a Russian tables game for two players. It is also played in Armenia as Long Nardi or Nardi. It probably originated in the historical Persian game of Nard. It requires a tables board, 15 men apiece and two dice.

Name 
The game is usually just known as Nardy or Nardi in Russian, but called Long Nardy to distinguish it from Backgammon which they call 'Short Nardy'. English sources sometimes mistranslate Nardy as "Backgammon", so the game is sometimes incorrectly called Long Backgammon. However, there are fundamental differences; for example, both players move in the same direction, whereas in Backgammon they move in opposing directions. There are also several apps known as Long Narde.

Rules 
There are two players. The tables board is divided into two halves (left and right). Each player has 15 men or pieces, which are placed along the right-hand side in the opponent's side of the board. Each players has a different set of pieces, usually distinguished by being coloured black and white. There are two dice. Players roll the dice in turn. Each player may only move his or her own pieces.

Moves 
The starting position of pieces on the board is called the "head". If the points along which the pieces move are numbered anticlockwise from 1 to 24 beginning at the lower right, then point 24 is White's head and point 12 is Black's head (see diagram). A move from the head is called a "head move". On a single turn, only one piece can be taken from the head (except on the first throw).

The first player, who also plays with the white pieces, is determined as follows: each player throws one die. The player who rolls the higher number is White and goes first. If they roll the same number, the dice are re-rolled. If the game consists of several rounds, then the colour of the pieces alternates, and the next round is started by the player who played the current round as Black.

The player's moves are based on the roll of the two dice, which should be thrown from a special leather dice cup. The dice must be rolled such that they end on one half of the board and lie flat on the surface. The dice must remain in the position in which they fell on the board until the end of the move. If a die falls into a different half of the board, or outside of it entirely, or comes to rest in an unstable position i.e. is 'cocked' (e.g. it rests on an edge, tilted against the side of the board or a piece), both dice must be re-rolled.

After rolling the dice, the player must either move two pieces anticlockwise by as many points as there are pips on each of the dice, or make two moves with one piece. If both dice have the same number of pips, it is a doublet and the roll counts double, that is, the player must make four moves with the pieces. A piece may not be moved to a point occupied by one or more opposing pieces. It is mandatory to move the number of points indicated on the die. If it is not possible to make a legal move, the move is forfeited, but if a move is possible, the player must make it, even if it is detrimental. If there are two possible moves, one using one die and the other using two, the player must make the move using both dice (the so-called "full move rule"). A turn is considered completed after pressing the button of the tournament clock, or handing the dice to the opponent.

Aim 
All 15 pieces must travel full circle (anticlockwise), enter the 'house' (i.e. home table) and be borne off The aim is to be the first player to do this. The house is the last quarter of the board. So White's house is made up of points 1-6 and Black's of points 13–18. 'Bearing off' is to make a move with a piece that takes it off the board. Bearing off is only allowed once all 15 pieces have 'come home' i.e. have arrived in the house. Thus White moves from the 19-24 table to the 1-6 table and Black from the 7-12 table to the 13-18 table.

Direction of travel 
This is difference from Short Nardy and from Backgammon. The main differences of this variant of tables game are:
Opening layout: all pieces on the head
Movement: both players move in the same direction; in Short Nardy and Backgammon, they move in opposite directions
Hitting: hitting adverse pieces is not allowed. A piece may not be moved to a point occupied by the adversary even by one piece
Locking (Prime): when all six points following a piece are occupied by the opponent, that piece cannot be moved. It is said to be 'locked'. Building a continuous row of six pieces (i.e. a prime is considered ideal for disrupting an opponent's game. However, a prime may not be formed if there are no enemy pieces already beyond it.

Play 
Each player throws two dice at the same time. After the throw, the player moves any of his pieces forward the number of points (spaces) equal to the pips on one of the dice, and then any other piece the number of points equal to the pips on the other die. That is, if a player rolls 3–5, then one piece is moved three points and another five points. Alternatively, one piece could be moved 8 points. It doesn't matter which move is made first. In this case, only one piece may be taken from the head.

For the first turn of the game an exception is made to the above rule. If it is not possible to move one piece from the head because it is blocked by the opponent's pieces, then a second piece may be moved from the head. There are only three such throws that enable a player to do this: 6-6, 4-4 and 3-3. In these cases, it is not possible to play a full move with one piece, as the pieces on the opponent's head block the move. If one of these combinations occurs, then the player can move two pieces from his head, unless there are pieces in any of the tables that can be used to make a move. So if White initially throws 5-5 and Black follows with 4-4, Black moves one piece from the head by playing one 4, since the obstacle created prevents him going further. Accordingly, if White's first throw is 2-2, and Black's is 5-5, Black moves one piece from the head by playing three 5s.

If a player rolls a doublet, it counts double and the player plays as if he threw 4 dice and may make 4 moves. The player has the right to change his move until the dice are handed to the opponent or the clock button is pressed. If, at that point, the move is found to be incomplete or against the rules, the opponent has the opportunity to accept the move as it was made, or require the player to make the correct move.

Block 
A player may build a block (prime, i.e. 6 occupied points in a row) of 6 pieces in order to 'lock' the opponent but, in doing so, there must be at least one enemy piece beyond the block which is thus free to move on to the opponent's house. It is not legal to lock all 15 opposing pieces. If, as a result of the block, an opponent cannot move any piece in accordance with the throw of the dice, the throw is forfeited and the opponent misses a turn. Equally, if only one legal move is possible, that move is made and the other is forfeited.

A player must move if able, even if it is not beneficial. If two separate moves cannot be made, then one longer move is made, or the second piece is moved from the head. For example, if 6-5 is thrown and the player can either move 6 points or 5, but not both, that player is obliged to use the higher die, in this case 6 and forfeit the 5.

Bearing off 
Once a player has moved all 15 pieces to the house, they may now be borne off. To do this the piece must be on the point corresponding to one of the dice. For example, if 6-3 is rolled, the player can bear off one piece from the 6 point and one from the 3 point. Alternatively a piece may be moved 3 points from the 4, 5 or 6 point. In the process of bearing pieces off from the house, the player has the right to use the dice roll at his own discretion: he may either play a piece within the house or bear it off if there is a choice. In the process of bearing pieces off checkers one's own house, pieces may be borne off from a point lower in number if there are none on the point corresponding to the die concerned. For example, if 6-5 is rolled, and there are no pieces on the 5 and 6 points, then two pieces may be borne off from the next lower point, in this case the 4 point or, if there are none on that, from the 3 point and so on.

Scoring 
In Long Nardy, there are normally only two possible outcomes: Oyn (1 point) and Mars (2 points). Oyn is achieved when a player is first to bear off all 15 pieces and the loser has borne off at least 1 piece. Mars occurs if the loser has failed to bear off any men and is worth double.

There is no concept of a draw in Long Nardy in its classical form, which has existed for many centuries. Initially, the game was conceived as an all out competition in which someone must win. The option of a draw in Long Nardy was introduced by the Nard Federation (Федерацией Нард) and has been practised for many years in live tournaments. According to Federation rules, White always starts the game. If White bears off all his pieces first, Black has a right to the last turn, so a situation may arise when Black, using his right to the last throw, also bears off all his pieces. In this case, the game ends in a draw, and the players receive half a point (½-½), or one point each (1-1), depending on the tournament regulations.

In isolated cases, players may add  Coke (3 points) and Home Mars (4 points), but they have nothing to do with Nardy and only occur on Russian gaming sites. They are not in any serious document on the game rules, regulations or tournament rules of Nardy.

See also 
 Nard
 Short Nardy i.e. Backgammon

References

Literature

Links 
 Narde at bkgm.com.
 How to Play Long Backgammon at 5minutecrafts.site.
 How to Arrange Long Backgammon at hungry-bags.ru.
 Long Backgammon - rules in brief at www.rubl.com.

Tables games
Russian games